Chidiya Ghar is a sitcom which aired on Sony SAB from 28 November 2011 to 2 October 2017. The series was produced by Ashwni Dhir under the banner of Garima Productions. The show gets its name “Chidiya Ghar” because Chidiya Ghar means “zoo” in Hindi as all the characters in this show have animal names of the hindi language.

Premise

Chidiya Ghar is a house in Banaras named after Mrs. Chidiya Kesari Narayan, late wife of retired principal, Shri Kesari Narayan. The story is about Kesari, his sons, Ghotak and Gomukh their respective wives, Koyal and Mayuri, younger son Kapi and his wife Chuhiya, grandchildren Gillu, Gaj, Machar, Makhi and daughter Maina, son-in-law Totaram, sister Billo, servant Gadha Prasad, his wife Naagin/Markatti and brother Mendak Prasad. Their names resemble animals and each individual bears some animal's characteristic and Kesari always teaches them a lesson being helpful in the future, after passing the problems of the same lessons. Their colony was named "Chidiya Ghar" in the honor of Kesari Narayan's contributions. It consists of Dimak Chacha, Girgit Mausi, her husband Bhed Vajpayee, their daughter Titli, her lover Tommy and his friend Puppy.

Through this show, Kesari Narayan i.e. Baabuji of Chidiya Ghar teaches educational values which he calls "Sanskaar". Each story, consisting of 1-10 episodes starts with Kesari teaching an idiom through his Chidiyaghar Pathshala, and an incident happens where the idiom comes true.

Cast

Main
 Rajendra Gupta as Kesari Narayan (Lion), "Baabuji" of Chidiya Ghar  
Mamta Gurnani as Chidiya Kesari Narayan  (Sparrow), Wife of Kesari Narayan / Maina (Starling), Daughter of Kesari and Chidiya 
 Paresh Ganatra as Ghotak Kesari Narayan (Horse), Eldest son of Kesari and Chidiya. 
 Shilpa Shinde  as  Koyal Ghotak Narayan (Nightingale), Wife of Ghotak. Shinde left the show in 2013 but came back in 2014, She again left the show after few months. (2011–2013, 2014)
 Shubhangi Atre Poorey as Koyal Ghotak Narayan, Poorey replaced Shinde in 2013.  (2013–2014)
 Aditi Sajwan as Koyal Ghotak Narayan, Sajwan replaced Shinde in 2014. (2014–2017) 
 Sumit Arora as Gomukh Kesari Narayan (Cow), Son of Kesari and Chidiya
 Debina Bonnerjee as Mayuri Gomukh Narayan (Peahen), Gowmukh's wife 
 Shafaq Naaz as Mayuri Gomukh Narayan, Naaz replaced Bonnerjee in 2014. (2014–2017) 
 Anjita Poonia as Teenage Gajgamini Gomukh Narayan / Gaj (Elephant), Gomukh and Mayuri's daughter
 Arshiya Mankar as Teenage Gajgamini Gomukh Narayan / Gaj
 Saraansh Verma as Kapi Kesari Narayan (Monkey), youngest son of Kesari and Chidiya
 Jitu Shivhare as Gaddha Prasad (Donkey), Servant of Chidiya Ghar later turned family member
 Mandakini Shrivastava as Naagin “Kasturi” Gaddha Prasad (Snake), first wife of Gadhaprasad 
 Arti Kandpal as Markati Gaddha Prasad (Monkey), second wife of Gadhaprasad
 Manish Vishwakarma as Mendak Prasad (Frog), Smaller brother of Gadhaprasad 
 Bhavin Bhanushali / Pratham Shetty as Teenage Gillendra Ghotak Narayan / Gillu (Squirrel), Ghotak and Koyal's son
Trishikha Ashish Tripathi as Chuhiya Kapi Narayan (Mouse), Wife of Kapi  (2015–2017)
 Isharat Ali as Deemak Sharma "Deemak Sharma" (Termite) (2017)
 Manju Sharma as Girgit Mausi (Chameleon), wife of Bhed, daughter of Chipkali (2017)
 Sheetal Pandya as Titli (Butterfly), daughter of Girgit Mausi (2017)
 Abhay Pratap Singh as Tommy Tiwari, Titli's lover (2017)
 Sanjay Chaudhary as Puppy, friend of Tommy and koyal's admirer (2017)
 Melissa Pais as Hirni (Deer), Servant of Chopra and Gadhaprasad's later love interest / Various Characters

Recurring
 Bharati Achrekar as Billo Bua (Cat), younger Sister of Kesari
 Rohitash Gaud as multiple characters like Pandit pipalprashnapuri, maulana, father
 Drisha Kalyani as Cheeti (Ant), Adopted daughter of Ghotak 
 Ketan Karande as Sandeshwar Mama (Saandhu Mama) (Bull), Brother of Chidiya 
 Prasad Barve as Chamkadar (Bat), Nephew of Gadhaprasad
 Jayshree Soni as Macchli (Fish)
 Sulbha Arya as Chamunda, elder sister of Kesari
 Shubhangi Gokhale as Murgeshwari Devi, Koyal's mother
 Debina Bonnerjee as Machli Mathur, Mayuri's mother
 Anchor Arya Nambiar as Memna, Kapi's friend & love interest
 Mehul Nisar as Tota, Maina's husband
 Yogesh Soni as Totaram, Maina's husband
 Jarnail Singh as Balwan
Aasif Sheikh as Pappi Luthra "Pappi Bhaisaab"; Kitti's husband, Jerry's father
Tapasya Nayak as Kitti; Pappi Bhaisaab's wife, Jerry's mother

Guest
Sanjay Mishra as Baba in episode 1 who gave the introduction to the show 
Surjit Saha as Rajveer
Yogesh Tripathi as Various Characters
Rucha Gujarathi as Kishmish
Manav Gohil as Manav, Gowmukh's School Friend
Kishwer Merchant as Sheela Kejwani, vice principal of Eanvois school
Rakhi Sawant as Rakhee Fox 
 Rahul Singh as Mr. Yog
 Ami Trivedi as Leelawati, spirit in Chidiya Ghar house whose marriage proposal was earlier rejected by Kesari.
 Umesh Bajpai as Baba Everest

References

External links
  on SAB TV

Sony SAB original programming
Indian comedy television series
2011 Indian television series debuts
2017 Indian television series endings
Television shows set in Uttar Pradesh